Yunos may refer to:

Afiq Yunos (born 1990), Singaporean footballer
Ismail Yunos (born 1986), Singaporean footballer
Yunos, Iran, a village in Hamadan Province, Iran
Yun OS, a Android-based operating system